Hillsport is a locality in the Canadian province of Ontario, located in the Thunder Bay District north of Manitouwadge. The area has a few permanent year-round residents and is the location of a family-owned wilderness recreational lodge currently branded as the Hillsport .

The area is served by the Hillsport railway station.

References

Communities in Thunder Bay District